Parker is a city in Bay County, Florida, United States. As of the 2010 census it had a population of 4,317. It is part of the Panama City–Lynn Haven–Panama City Beach Metropolitan Statistical Area.

Geography

Demographics

At the 2010 census there were 4,317 people in 1,861 households, including 1,179 families, in the city. The racial makeup of the city was 78.5% White, 12.5% African American, 0.9% American Indian or Alaska Native, 2.5% Asian, 1.2% some other race, and 4.3% from two or more races. Hispanic or Latino of any race were 5.6%.

There were 1,861 households, 23.6% had children under the age of 18 living with them, 42.8% were headed by married couples living together, 14.5% had a female householder with no husband present, and 36.6% were non-families. 29.4% of households were made up of individuals, and 11.6% were someone living alone who was 65 or older. The average household size was 2.32, and the average family size was 2.82.

The age distribution was 21.2% under the age of 18, 9.1% from 18 to 24, 24.3% from 25 to 44, 28.0% from 45 to 64, and 17.4% 65 or older. The median age was 40.9 years. For every 100 females, there were 94.8 males. For every 100 females age 18 and over, there were 91.6 males.

As of the 2000 census, the median household income was $35,813, and the median family income  was $43,929. Males had a median income of $28,455 versus $21,205 for females. The per capita income for the city was $18,660. About 10.1% of families and 12.2% of the population were below the poverty line, including 21.3% of those under age 18 and 4.6% of those age 65 or over.

Education
Parker is home to Parker Elementary School , the city is part of the Bay County School District.

References

Cities in Bay County, Florida
Populated places on the Intracoastal Waterway in Florida
Populated places established in 1830
Cities in Florida
Former census-designated places in Florida
1830 establishments in Florida Territory